Crimple Beck or the River Crimple is a beck which flows through North Yorkshire, England. It is a tributary of the River Nidd which it joins between Little Ribston and Walshford north of Wetherby. Its tributaries include the Park Beck.

Course
The beck rises on the flanks of Stainburn Moor near Beckwithshaw and flows in an easterly direction to join the Nor Beck before passing through the villages of Burn Bridge and Pannal It continues in a north-easterly direction, being bridged by the A61 and the Crimple Valley Viaduct just to the south of Harrogate. At the confluence with the Rud Brook it turns to the south-east, and meets the Park Brook before reaching Spofforth where it is bridged by the A661. Beyond Spofforth its course continues to Blackstones where it is measured, joining the River Nidd midway between Little Ribston and Walshford.

Hydrology
The flow of the beck is measured by two gauging stations, the first near Burn Bridge in its upper reaches has operated since 1972, the second  near to the confluence with the Nidd, at Blackstones since 1991.

Land use within the basin is mainly rural, consisting of grassland and arable with some woodland, and the urbanised area around Harrogate.

See also
List of rivers of Yorkshire
List of rivers of England
Crimplene – named after the valley

References

External links
 
Crimple water levels

Rivers of North Yorkshire